Lucky Man is the second studio album of saxophonist Dave Koz.
It was released by Capitol Records on  June 29, 1993 in NYC, followed by a nationwide release in November 1993 and international release in May 1994.
The album peaked at number 2 on Billboard Top Contemporary Jazz Albums chart.
The album has sold over 500,000 copies in the United States and has thus been certified gold by the RIAA.

One of the tracks on the album, "Faces of the Heart", was used as the theme to the ABC soap opera General Hospital from 1993-2004.

Track listing

Personnel 
 Dave Koz – alto saxophone (1, 3, 5, 7-13), baritone saxophone (1, 13), tenor saxophone (1, 7, 13), arrangements (1, 2, 4-12), keyboards (2, 6, 10, 12), soprano saxophone (2, 6, 7), additional keyboards (3, 7, 11), programming (4), saxophone (4), backing chanter (4), breath noises (4), backing vocals (5), EWI (6, 7), whisperers (7)
 Jeff Lorber – keyboards (1, 8, 10, 11), arrangements (1, 2, 4, 5, 7, 9), drum programming (8, 10), synth bass (10, 11), programming (11)
 Bill Payne – acoustic piano (1)
 Chester Thompson – organ (1)
 Jeff Koz – keyboards (2, 12), acoustic guitar (2, 12), bass programming (2), drum programming (2), arrangements (2, 11, 12), electric guitar (3), nylon guitar (3)
 Brad Cole – keyboards (3), acoustic piano (3), sax section arrangements (13)
 Dennis Lambert – programming (4), arrangements (4), backing chanter (4), backing vocals (5)
 Tim Carmon – keyboard programming (5)
 Anthony DeTiege – keyboard programming (5)
 Billy Moss – keyboard programming (5)
 Claude Gaudette – keyboards (6), acoustic piano (6), synth bass (6), strings (6), string arrangements (6), bass (7), drum programming (7)
 Carl Sturken – keyboards (6), acoustic guitar (6), arrangements (6)
 John Barnes – acoustic piano (7)
 Kenny Moore – acoustic piano (7)
 Booker T. Jones – organ (7)
 Robbie Buchanan – keyboards (9), synthesizer programming (9), arrangements (9)
 Greg Phillinganes – acoustic piano (12)
 Robben Ford – guitar (1)
 Oliver Leiber – additional guitar (1), guitars (10)
 Michael Thompson – electric guitar (2, 12)
 Bob Mann – acoustic guitar (3)
 Paul Jackson, Jr. – guitars (7, 8), rhythm guitar (10)
 Teddy Castellucci – acoustic guitar (9), electric guitar (9)
 Buzz Feiten – guitar fills (10), additional guitar (11)
  Carlos Rios – electric guitar (11), guitar solo (11)
 Alec Milstein – bass (1), electric bass (5, 8, 10, 11)
 Nathan East – bass (2, 12), electric bass (7)
 John Pena – bass (3)
 Jimmy Haslip – fretless bass (6)
 Pino Palladino – fretless bass (8, 11)
 John Robinson – drums (1, 9, 11), drum fills (8)
 Rayford Griffin – drums (2, 12)
 Ricky Lawson – drums (3)
 Mark Schulman – drums (6)
 Ed Greene – drums (7)
 Curt Bisquera – drums (10)
 Lenny Castro – percussion (1, 2, 10, 12)
 Michito Sanchez – percussion (3)
 Steve Reid – percussion (6)
 Michael Fisher – percussion (7, 9)
 Paulinho da Costa – percussion (8, 11)
 Maceo Parker – alto saxophone (7)
 Stephen "Doc" Kupka – baritone saxophone (7)
 Clarence Clemons – tenor saxophone (7)
 Jeremy Lubbock – string arrangements and conductor (3)
 Jules Chaikin – string contractor (3)
 Franne Golde – backing chanter (4), backing vocals (5)
 Evelyn King – backing chanter (4), backing vocals (5)
 Jheryl Lockhart – backing chanter (4), backing vocals (5)
 Jean McClain – backing chanter (4), backing vocals (5)
 Katrina Perkins – backing chanter (4), backing vocals (5)
 Zelma Davis – lead and backing vocals (5)
 Phil Perry – lead vocals (6)
 Evan Rogers – backing vocals (6), arrangements (6)
 Edward James Olmos – spoken introduction (7)
 Charles Pettigrew – vocals (9)

Party Goers on "Saxman"
 Tim Carmon, Anthony DeTiege, Jud Friedman, Karin Friedman, Audrey Koz, Norman Koz, Bobby Kranc, Paul La Combe, Tina Lambert, Simone Lazer, Hilary Mandel, Mark Mattson, Cassandre McGowan, Billy Moss, Harley Neuman, David Pearlman, David Perler, Allan Rich, Nick Smith, David Williams, Patrick Wilson, Roberta Wilson and Taylor Rose Wilson

Choir on "Show Me the Way"
 Alex Brown, Jim Gilstrap, Phillip Ingram, Katrina Perkins,  Jeff Pescetto, Leslie Smith, Yvonne Williams, Gigi Worth, Mona Lisa Young and Terry Young

Production 
 Bruce Lundvall – executive producer 
 Dave Koz – producer (1, 2, 3, 6, 8, 10-13), associate producer (5, 7, 9), liner notes 
 Jeff Lorber – producer (1, 8, 10), engineer 
 Jeff Koz – producer (2, 3, 11, 12)
 Dennis Lambert – producer (5, 7, 9)
 Evan Rogers – producer (6)
 Carl Sturken – producer (6)
 Nick Els – engineer 
 Gabriel Moffat – engineer 
 Ed Murphy – engineer 
 Doug Rider – engineer, mixing (13)
 Allen Sides – engineer 
 Gabe Veltri – engineer 
 Dan Bosworth – second engineer 
 Martin Brumbach – second engineer
 Jim Champagne – second engineer
 Mark Levinson – second engineer
 Bob Loftus – second engineer 
 Nica Lorber – second engineer 
 Eric Rudd – second engineer
 Mick Stern – second engineer
 Shelly Stewart – second engineer
 Howard Willing – second engineer
 John Zaika – second engineer
 Alan Meyerson – mixing (1-12)
 John Chamberlin – second mix engineer (1-12)
 Kimm James – second mix engineer (1-12)
 Thom Russo – second mix engineer (1-12)
 Jamie Seyberth – second mix engineer (1-12)
 Willie Will – second mix engineer (1-12)
 Jeff Shannon – second mix engineer (13)
 Steve Hall – mastering   
 Colleen Donahue-Reynolds – project coordinator (6)
 Jeffrey Fey – art direction
 Tommy Steele – art direction, design
 Scott Morgan – photography
 Shelly Haber – management 
 Leanne Meyers – management
 Vision Management – management company 

Studios
 Recorded at JHL Sound (Pacific Palisades, CA); The Village Recorder, Record One, Westlake Studios, The Bakery Recording Studios and Who  Did That Music? (Los Angeles, CA); O'Henry Sound Studios and Ocean Studios (Burbank, CA); Ocean Way Recording, Trax Recording Studio, The Bunny Hop and Bill Schnee Studios (Hollywood, CA); Kiva Recording and The Zoo (Encino, CA); The Loft Recording Studios (Bronxville, New York).
 Mixed at Larrabee North (North Hollywood, CA); Larrabee West (West Hollywood, CA); O'Henry Sound Studios.
 Mastered at Future Disc (Hollywood, California).

Charts

Certifications

References 

Dave Koz albums
1993 albums
Capitol Records albums
Instrumental albums